Tana FC Formation is a football (soccer) club from Madagascar based in Analamanga. Their home stadium is Rabemananjara Stadium, which has a capacity of 10,000 people.

Achievements
Coupe de Madagascar: 0
Runners-up: 2009, 2011

Performance in CAF competitions
CAF Confederation Cup: 1 appearance
2012 -

Football clubs in Madagascar
Analamanga